Neolamprologus falcicula is a species of cichlid endemic to Lake Tanganyika where it is only known from the waters off Burundi.  This species can reach a length of  TL.  It can also be found in the aquarium trade.

References

External links
Lost African Lake Spawned Fish Diversity "Beyond Belief"

falcicula
Fish of Burundi
Freshwater fish of Africa
Fish described in 1989
Taxonomy articles created by Polbot